Tulem District is a district (bakhsh) in Sowme'eh Sara County, Gilan Province, Iran. 

As of the 2006 census, its population was 29,355, in 8,131 families.  The District has one city, Marjaghal, and two rural districts (dehestan): Hend Khaleh Rural District and Tulem Rural District.

References 

Sowme'eh Sara County
Districts of Gilan Province